Renison may refer to:

Renison Bell, underground tin mine and locality on the West Coast of Tasmania, Australia
Renison University College, is a public university college located in Waterloo, Ontario and affiliated with the University of Waterloo
Renison University College School of Social Work, one of the schools that compose the University of Waterloo